Limb Music is an independent record label based in Hamburg, Germany and specialized in various subgenres of heavy metal music. It was also known as LMP, which stood for Limb Music Products, later changed to Limb Music GmbH. The music publishing firm Limb Music Publishing e.K. was established in 1989. Their mail order company Forever Rock (www.forever-rock.de) was founded in 2008.

Artists

 Abraxas
 Adagio
 Ancient Bards
 Archetype
 Ascension
 Astralion
 Black Majesty
 Burning Black
 Burning Point
 Casus Belli
 Chinchilla
 Civilization One
 Code of Perfection
 Concerto Moon
 Cryonic Temple
 Delirion
 Domain
 Double Dealer
 Dragony
 Dungeon
 Dustsucker
 Eldritch
 Emerald Sun
 Eternal Reign
 Exhibition
 Excalion
 Eyefear
 Fireforce
 FireWölfe
 Flashback of Anger
 Fogalord
 Galloglass
 Ghost Machinery
 Gothic Knights
 Gun Barrel
 Heavens Gate
 Human Fortress
 Icycore
 Illusion Suite
 InnerWish
 Invictus (band)
 Ironware
 Ivory Tower
 Jack Starr featuring Rhett Forrester
 Jack Starr's Burning Starr
 Juvaliant
 Kenziner
 Khali
 Lana Lane
 Last Kingdom
 LionSoul
 Luca Turilli
 Lucid Dreaming
 Magic Kingdom
 Magnitude 9
 Masters of Disguise
 Midnight Sun
 Minotaurus
 Mob Rules
 Montany
 Olympos Mons
 Oratory
 Pagan's Mind
 Patrick Rondat
 Poverty's No Crime
 Red Circuit
 Revoltons
 Rhapsody
 Rising Faith
 Roxxcalibur
 Sandstone
 Savage Grace
 Shadowkeep
 Sharon
 Silent Memorial
 Skeletor
 Skyliner
 Squad21
 Stevie McLaughlin
 Symphonity 
 The Armada
 The Reign of Terror
 Tiles
 Time Machine
 Total Eclipse
 Tystnaden
 Typhoon Motor Dudes
 Valley's Eve
 Vanden Plas
 Vanishing Point
 Vexillum
 Winter's Verge
 Wizard
 Zandelle

See also
 List of record labels

External links
 

German independent record labels
German record labels
Heavy metal record labels